The Tampere Tatar Congregation (formerly The Tampere Islamic Congregation, Fin: Tampereen islamilainen seurakunta) is an islamic congregation of local Tatars in the city of Tampere, Finland. Its facilities are located on the street Hämeenkatu. It was founded in 1943.

History 
The early generations of Tatars in Tampere had a long-time wish to establish their own congregation in their city, through which they could get together to pray, operate their own school education and in general, maintain their language and culture. Before establishing the congregation, Tatars in Tampere belonged to Suomen muhamettilainen seurakunta (The Finnish Mohammedan Congregation). It later became Suomen Islam-seurakunta (The Finnish Islamic Congregation), which has its main building in Fredrikinkatu, Helsinki. Also, Tampereen Turkkilainen Yhdistys (The Tampere Turkish Society) was important for them during those times.

In October 1942, they bought a space in Satakunnankatu 4 (a street in Tampere). The Tampere Islamic Congregation was registered in 1943.

A big financial contributor and the first chairman was a Tatar-businessman named Ymär Sali.

The name was changed to The Tampere Tatar Congregation (Tampereen tataariseurakunta) in 2019. Its official address is Hämeenkatu 29 A 9.

Cemeteries 
The congregation has two rows for the deceased of their community: one in Kalevankangas Cemetery (in Tampere), other in Vatiala Cemetery (in Kangasala).

References

Further reading 
 Muazzez Baibulat: The Tampere Islamic Congregation: the roots and history. Gummerus Kirjapaino Oy, 2004. 

Tampere
Finnish Tatars
Tatar organizations
Tatar culture
Muslim communities in Europe